The discography of the Serbian indie/alternative rock band Obojeni Program (Serbian Cyrillic: Обојени програм; trans. Colored Program), consists of eight studio albums, two compilation albums, one live album and two singles.

Studio albums

Live albums

Compilation albums

Singles

Other appearances

References 
 Obojeni Program at Discogs
 EX YU ROCK enciklopedija 1960-2006, Janjatović Petar; 
 NS rockopedija, novosadska rock scena 1963-2003, Mijatović Bogomir, SWITCH, 2005

Discographies of Serbian artists
Rock music group discographies